Ziamet was a form of land tenure in the Ottoman Empire, consisting in grant of lands or revenues by the Ottoman Sultan to an individual in compensation for their services, especially military services. The ziamet system was introduced by Osman I, who granted land tenure to his troops. Later, this system was expanded by Murad I for his Sipahi.

Background
The Seljuq state, prior to the rise of the Ottoman State in the 14th century, utilized ziamets in an effort to implement provincial governors, who were also made subordinate chiefs in the military regime. In this pre-Ottoman period, timars were used with other tactics, such as building caravansaries, in an effort to sedentarize nomadic groups. The Ottoman state later took on this "timar system" after conquering Anatolia, and it represented just one of several institutions apparent in the Ottoman Empire derived from the Seljuq state.

History
The Ottoman Empire came into disarray due to problems asserting "central government control" during the 16th and 17th centuries. They needed a way to reassert their military might. Ziamets of Ottoman cavalry were enlarged and turned over to a smaller number of owners, with a longer tenure. Thus, authority in provincial areas turned to police authority as local administrations dissolved, and ziamets were converted into tax-farms or iqta. This conversion of ziamets into tax-farms proved to be the first step to growing provincial control in the Ottoman Empire, as economic decline in the empire gave these stronger provincial governors the chance to assert power.

The ziamet holder acted as an agent of the central Ottoman government in supervising the possession, transfer, and rental of lands within his territory, and collecting tax revenue, in return for military service. A timar was not necessarily made up of contiguous property but could consist of property scattered among different villages.

A timar holder is a zaim.

Zeamet
A Zeamet was the appellative given to a land in the timar system during the Ottoman Empire between the 14th and 16th centuries, that had a tax revenue with an annual value between 20,000 and 100,000 akçes. The revenues produced from the land acted as compensation for military services.

Notes

Medieval economics
Land management in the Ottoman Empire
Turkish words and phrases